Christiane Ritter (13 July 1897, in Karlsbad – 29 December 2000, in Vienna) was an Austrian writer. She is best known for her book A Woman in the Polar Night about her stay on Svalbard in 1933. Originally published in 1938, her book is one of the few account from written from a female perspective detailing life outside civilizations before the 20th century.

References 

Austrian women writers
1897 births
2000 deaths
20th-century Austrian writers
Writers from Karlovy Vary
20th-century women writers
Women centenarians
Austrian centenarians